Abarth 500 may refer to the following variants of the Fiat 500:

 Abarth 695 SS – produced from 1964 to 1971
 Fiat Cinquecento Abarth – based on the Fiat Cinquecento (500 in Italian) from 1991
 Abarth 500 (2008) – produced from 2008 on
 Abarth 500 (2023) – to be produced from 2023

500
500